Petar B. Vasilev nicknamed Milevin (1918–2001), was a Bulgarian film director and screenwriter.

He was among the prominent Bulgarian film directors from the last decades of the 20th century best known for his satirical comedies. Most of them obtained a broad popularity and became a classic works of the Bulgarian cinematography, most notably Jack of All Trades (1962), Whale (1970), Farsighted for Two Diopters (1976), Maneuvers on the Fifth Floor (1985) and especially the sequence about The Past-Master (1970–1983).

Filmography

Selected Director filmography

References

Sources

External links

Bulgarian film directors
Bulgarian screenwriters
Male screenwriters
1918 births
2001 deaths
People from Montana Province
20th-century screenwriters